Jamaal Hakeem Green (born June 5, 1980) is a former American football defensive end.  He played for the Philadelphia Eagles, Chicago Bears, and the Washington Redskins in his career.  Green played college football at the University of Miami and was drafted in the fourth round of the 2003 NFL Draft.  On February 17, 2008, Green became a United States Border Patrol agent in the El Paso area.

Raised in Camden, New Jersey, Green attended Woodrow Wilson High School.

References

1980 births
Living people
American football defensive ends
Chicago Bears players
Miami Hurricanes football players
Players of American football from Camden, New Jersey
Woodrow Wilson High School (New Jersey) alumni
Philadelphia Eagles players
Washington Redskins players